Timothy Lee Lester (June 15, 1968 – January 12, 2021) was an American professional football player.

Career
He was a running back for eight seasons in the National Football League (NFL) with the Los Angeles Rams, Pittsburgh Steelers, and Dallas Cowboys. Lester was drafted by the Rams in the tenth round of the 1992 NFL Draft.

Death
Lester died from complications of COVID-19 in January 2021, at the age of 52.

References

1968 births
2021 deaths
Miami Southridge Senior High School alumni
Players of American football from Miami
American football running backs
Eastern Kentucky Colonels football players
Dallas Cowboys players
Deaths from the COVID-19 pandemic in Georgia (U.S. state)
Los Angeles Raiders players
Pittsburgh Steelers players
Scottish Claymores coaches
Ed Block Courage Award recipients